María Irigoyen was the defending champion, but chose to participate in Madrid instead.

Ons Jabeur won the title, defeating Romina Oprandi in the final, 1–6, 6–2, 6–2.

Seeds

Main draw

Finals

Top half

Bottom half

References 
 Main draw

Nana Trophy - Singles